Kaohsiung Exhibition Center is a light rail station of the Circular Line of the Kaohsiung rapid transit system. It is located in Lingya District, Kaohsiung, Taiwan.

Station overview
The station is a street-level station with two side platforms. It is located within Singuang Ferry Wharf beside the Kaohsiung Exhibition Center.

Station layout

Around the station
 Kaohsiung Exhibition Center

 Xinguang Riverside Park
 Singuang Ferry Wharf
 Horizon City Marina
 Kaohsiung Port Pier 21
 85 Sky Tower

References

2015 establishments in Taiwan
Railway stations opened in 2015
Circular light rail stations